Proposed countries may refer to: 
 List of proposed state mergers 
 Lists of active separatist movements
 List of historical separatist movements

Proposed countries